Live: P-Funk Earth Tour is a live double album by Parliament that documents the band's 1977 P-Funk Earth Tour. The performances include songs from Parliament's albums through The Clones of Dr. Funkenstein as well as songs from the Funkadelic repertoire. The album is made up of portions of two performances from January 1977 at the Oakland Coliseum Arena and the Los Angeles Forum.

The track "The Landing (Of The Holy Mothership)" is a musical montage that mixes clips of various P-Funk recordings with broadcast news-style commentary from George Clinton. The original vinyl release contained a 22 × 33" inch poster of George Clinton dressed as Dr. Funkenstein (photo by Diem Jones), as well as an iron-on T-shirt transfer that boasted the slogan "Take Funk To Heaven in '77!". "Parliament Live" became the group's third album to be certified gold.

Track listing
 "P-Funk (Wants To Get Funked Up)" – 6:13 (released as a 12" promo single-Casablanca NBD 20103 DJ)
 "Dr. Funkenstein's Supergroovalisticprosifunkstication Medley" – 4:58
 "Do That Stuff" – 5:14
 "The Landing (Of The Holy Mothership)" – 3:04 (released as the b-side of "Fantasy Is Reality")
 "The Undisco Kidd (The Girl Is Bad!)" – 7:02
 "Children of Production" – 2:50
 "Mothership Connection (Star Child)" – 5:51
 "Swing Down, Sweet Chariot" – 5:06 (released as a 12" promo single-Casablanca NBD 20103 DJ)
 "This Is The Way We Funk With You" – 5:03
 "Dr. Funkenstein" – 15:07
 "Gamin' On Ya!" – 4:09 (released as a 12" promo single-Casablanca NBD 20103 DJ)
 "Tear The Roof Off The Sucker Medley" – 4:57
 "Night Of The Thumpasorus People" – 6:13
 "Fantasy Is Reality" – 6:40 (released as a single-Casablanca 892 and 12" single-Casablanca 20103 DJ)

Note: The last track from the original double LP release, "Fantasy Is Reality", was omitted on the CD reissue due to space restrictions.

Personnel

Vocals: George Clinton, Calvin Simon, Fuzzy Haskins, Raymond Davis, Grady Thomas, Garry Shider, Glenn Goins, Debbie Wright, Jeanette Washington
Horns: Fred Wesley, Maceo Parker, Rick Gardner, Richard Griffith
Bass: Cordell Mosson, Bootsy Collins
Guitars: Garry Shider, Michael Hampton, Glen Goins, Eddie Hazel
Drums & Percussion: Jerome Brailey
Keyboards & Synthesizers: Bernie Worrell
Extra-Singing Clones: Lynn Mabry, Dawn Silva, Gary Cooper
Lead Snore on "This Is The Way We Funk With You": Michael Hampton
Horn Arrangements: Bernie Worrell & Fred Wesley
Rhythm Arrangements: Bootsy Collins & George Clinton

References

External links
 Parliament Live – P.Funk Earth Tour at Discogs

Parliament (band) albums
1977 live albums
Casablanca Records live albums